Okinami may refer to:
 okinami (沖波), a Japanese word translated as "offshore wave", a type of ocean surface wave
 Japanese destroyer Okinami of the Imperial Japanese Navy
 Kanagawa oki nami ura, the Japanese name for the woodblock print The Great Wave off Kanagawa